Marcel Duchemin (born 20 October 1944) is a former French cyclist. He participated in the 1972 Summer Olympics in Munich and finished 42nd in the road race. His sporting career began with ABC Rex-Vox-Cinemas Le Mans.

He also won the Tour de Bretagne Cycliste 3 times.

References

1944 births
Living people
French male cyclists
Cyclists at the 1972 Summer Olympics
Olympic cyclists of France